is a style of Japanese residential architecture used in the mansions of the military, temple guest halls, and Zen abbot's quarters of the Muromachi (1336－1573), Azuchi–Momoyama (1568–1600) and Edo periods (1600–1868). It forms the basis of today's traditional-style Japanese house. Characteristics of the  development were the incorporation of square posts and floors completely covered with tatami.

History

The foundations for the design of today's traditional Japanese residential houses with tatami floors were established in the late Muromachi period (approximately 1338 to 1573) and refined during the ensuing Momoyama period. The term , meaning study or drawing room has been used to denote reception rooms in residences of the military elite as well as study rooms at monasteries.

The main reception room is characterized by specific features: a recessed alcove (tokonoma); staggered shelves; built-in desks; and ornate sliding doors. The entrance hall (genkan) emerged as an element of residential architecture during the Momoyama period. The oldest extant  style building is the Tōgu-dō at Ginkaku-ji dating from 1485. Other representative examples of early  style, also called shuden, include two guest halls at Mii-dera. In the early Edo period,  reached its peak and spread beyond the residences of the military elite.

Conrad Totman argues that the development of the  style was linked to a lumber scarcity, caused by excessive deforestation, which prompted the use of lower-quality, more abundant material. As larger, straight-grained trees became less accessible, "elegant wooden flooring gave way to crude wooden under-flooring that was concealed beneath tatami." Likewise, sliding wooden doors were replaced with fusuma, a lightweight combination of "stiff fabric or cardboard-like material pasted onto a frame made of slender wooden sticks," and shōji sliding panels served as a substitute for more elaborate paneled wooden doors.

In the 16th century Sen no Rikyū established dedicated  style teahouses characterized by their small size of typically two to eight mat, the use of natural materials, and rustic appearance. This teahouse style, exemplified by the Joan and Taian teahouses, was influenced by Japanese farmhouse style and the  style featuring tatami matted floors, recessed alcoves (tokonoma) and one or more ante chambers for preparations.

Sukiya-zukuri

The result was an informal version of the  style called . The  style has a characteristic decorative alcove and shelf, and utilizes woods such as cedar, pine, hemlock, bamboo, and cypress, often with rough surfaces including the bark. Compared to the  style's, roof eaves in the sukiya style bend downward. While the  style was suitable for ceremonial architecture, it became too imposing for residential buildings. Consequently, the less formal sukiya style was used for the mansions of the aristocracy and samurai after the beginning of the Edo period.

See also
List of National Treasures of Japan (residences)
List of architectural styles

Notes

References

House styles
Japanese architectural styles
Buddhism in the Muromachi period
Buddhism in the Azuchi–Momoyama period